Katanić is a surname found in Serbia and Croatia.  People with the name include:

 Aleksandar Katanić (born 1995), Serbian football player
 Jelena Katanić (born 1988), Serbian biochemist
 Marko Katanić (volleyball) (born 1961), Luxembourgian volleyball player
 Marko Katanić (colonel) (1830–1907), Serbian honorary general
 , Serbian officer
 Sasa Katanić (born 1993), Serbian Entrepreneur

References

Serbian surnames
Croatian surnames